Kai Heerings (born 12 January 1990) is a Dutch professional footballer who plays as a central defender for IJsselmeervogels.

Career
Heerings was promoted to the first team of FC Utrecht from its youth academy in 2011. He made his professional debut on 20 August 2011, in a match against Vitesse. In 2010, he had signed his first senior contract with the club; a two-year deal with a two-year option. Heerings was ultimately part of the first team of Utrecht for four years, culminating in fifth-place finish in the Eredivisie in the 2012–13 season. He himself made 17 league appearances that season.

Heerings signed a one-year contract with SC Cambuur in May 2015, with an option for another season, as he was set to replace the outgoing Lucas Bijker. However, he only made five appearances for the club, before being sent on a six-month loan to Helmond Sport in the second-tier Eerste Divisie for the remainder of the 2015–16 season in January 2016.

Heerings signed a two-year contract with Austrian club SKN St. Pölten in June 2016, who had won the second-tier Austrian Football Second League in the previous season and thus promoted to the Austrian Bundesliga. In January 2017, he moved to Germany to Regionalliga club FC 08 Homburg, with whom he received a contract valid until June 2019. After the club suffered relegation from the Regionalliga Südwest, he returned to the Netherlands, where he joined the second division club Fortuna Sittard, where he also received a contract valid until June 2019.

In September 2019, after his contract with Fortuna expired, Heerings committed to Indian Super League club NorthEast United for two seasons.

Heerings signed a one-year contract with MVV Maastricht in August 2020, which took him over on as a free agent.

On 19 August 2021, he joined IJsselmeervogels.

Personal life
With his brother-in-law, Heerings has developed the JZ Design Game Case, a portable case and monitor for games consoles. The product was inspired by Heerings' own experiences of boredom when travelling for football matches, and the case has proved popular among professional athletes. Customers include Lionel Messi, Sergio Aguero and Lewis Hamilton.

References

External links
 Voetbal International profile 
 
 

1990 births
Living people
Dutch footballers
Association football defenders
AFC Ajax players
FC Volendam players
Jong FC Utrecht players
FC Utrecht players
SC Cambuur players
Helmond Sport players
SKN St. Pölten players
FC 08 Homburg players
Fortuna Sittard players
NorthEast United FC players
MVV Maastricht players
ENTHOI Lakatamia FC players
IJsselmeervogels players
Eredivisie players
Eerste Divisie players
Indian Super League players
Austrian Football Bundesliga players
Regionalliga players
Tweede Divisie players
Footballers from Amsterdam
Dutch expatriate sportspeople in Austria
Expatriate footballers in Austria
Dutch expatriate sportspeople in Germany
Expatriate footballers in Germany
Dutch expatriate sportspeople in India
Expatriate footballers in India
Dutch expatriate sportspeople in Cyprus
Expatriate footballers in Cyprus
Dutch expatriate footballers